
These are the films of Oliver Hardy as an actor. For the filmography of Laurel and Hardy as a team, see: Laurel and Hardy films.

Unconfirmed film appearances
 The Artist's Model (1916) 
 Terrible Kate (1917) 
 His Movie Mustache (1917) 
 Bad Kate (1917) 
 This Is Not My Room (1917) 
 Pipe Dreams and Prizes (1920) 
 The Perfect Lady (1924) 
 Roaring Lions at Home (1924) 
 Laughing Ladies (1925)

References

External links
 

Male actor filmographies
American filmographies